John Wyndham (2 March 1648 – 29 February 1724) was the member of the Parliament of England for Salisbury for the parliaments of 1681 and 1685.

References

External links 

Members of Parliament for Salisbury
English MPs 1681
1648 births
1724 deaths
English MPs 1685–1687